The area of trees and shrubs in the city of Perm in 2000 was:

In 2000, by the order of city administration Perm State University
drew up an inventory of trees and shrubs, which embraced Industrialny and Leninsky city districts completely and other city districts partially. 697,055 trees was taken into account.

The city administration makes efforts to plant trees and shrubs. Since 1999, a "Green Wall" campaign is conducted with the purpose of increase in quantity of trees and shrubs. The action is realized by force of OTOSes, schoolchildren and volunteers.

See also 
 Urban forests of Perm

References 

Perm, Russia
Flora of Russia